Alam Muzaffarnagari (1901-1969), born as Muhammad Ishaaq in  Muzaffarnagar, then part of the North-West Provinces of British India, was a poet and writer.

Two collections of his poems (mainly ghazals), titled Salsabil and Kausar o Tasniim, have been published.

References

Urdu-language poets from India
Muslim poets
1901 births
1969 deaths
20th-century Indian poets
People from Muzaffarnagar